Dokka is the administrative centre of Nordre Land Municipality in Innlandet county, Norway.

The Østsinni Church is located on the north edge of the village.

The Norwegian County Road 33 runs from Odnes in the southeast through Dokka, past Nordsinni and westwards to Etnedal and Bjørgo. Norwegian County Road 245 runs to the south from Dokka, along the west side of the Randsfjorden to Bjoneroa. Norwegian County Road 250 heads north from Dokka towards Aust-Torpa. In 2002, Dokka celebrated its 100th anniversary.

Name
The village is named after the local river Dokka, a tributary of the river Etna. The name of the river Dokka is derived from the Old Norse word  which means "hollow" or "depression".

Fun fact: The word dokka (どっか）is a slang term meaning "somewhere" in Japanese. By saying Dokka-toiu-dokka-ni-iku you are essentially saying "I'm going somewhere called Dokka."

Notable residents 
Rune Brattsveen (born 1984), a Norwegian biathlete 
Kjetil Bjørklund (born 1967), a Norwegian politician for the Socialist Left Party 
Joachim Sørum (born 1979), a Norwegian footballer
Trine Marie Lillehaug (born 2001), a local musician

See also
Dokka Station, a former railway station in Dokka

References

Nordre Land
Villages in Innlandet